The Romanian Athenaeum is a concert hall in the center of Bucharest, Romania, and a landmark of the Romanian capital city. Opened in 1888, the ornate, domed, circular building is the city's most prestigious concert hall and home of the "George Enescu" Philharmonic and of the George Enescu Festival.

History 
In 1865, cultural and scientific personalities such as Constantin Esarcu, V. A. Urechia, and Nicolae Creţulescu founded the Romanian Athenaeum Cultural Society.  To serve its purposes, the Romanian Athenaeum, a building dedicated to art and science, would be erected in Bucharest.

The building was designed by the French architect Albert Galleron, built on a property that had belonged to the Văcărescu family and inaugurated in 1888, although work continued until 1897.  A portion of the construction funds was raised by public subscription in a 28-year-long effort, of which the slogan is still remembered today: "Donate one leu for the Ateneu!" (Romanian "Dați un leu pentru Ateneu!").

On December 29, 1919, the Athenaeum was the site of the conference of leading Romanians who voted to ratify the unification of Bessarabia, Transylvania, and Bukovina with the Romanian Old Kingdom to constitute Greater Romania.

Extensive reconstruction and restoration work has been conducted in 1992 by a Romanian construction company and restoration painter Silviu Petrescu, saving the building from collapse.  The nine million Euro required were contributed in equal shares by the government and the Council of Europe Development Bank.

Building and facilities 
The overall style is neoclassical, with some more romantic touches.  In front of the building there is a small park and a statue of Romanian poet Mihai Eminescu.

Inside, the ground floor hosts an ornate conference hall as large as the auditorium above; in the auditorium there are 600 seats in the stalls, the rest of the seats being placed in 52 loges.

A  fresco by Costin Petrescu decorates the inside of the circular wall of the concert hall.  Painted using the al fresco technique, the piece depicts the most important moments of Romanian history, starting with the conquest of Dacia by Roman emperor Trajan and ending with the realization of Greater Romania in 1918.

Recognized as a symbol of Romanian culture, the building has been inscribed in 2007 on the list of the Label of European Heritage sites.

Gallery

See also  
 Tourism in Romania
 Seven Wonders of Romania
 List of concert halls
 George Enescu Festival
 George Enescu Philharmonic Orchestra

References 

Athenaeum
Music venues completed in 1888
Historic monuments in Bucharest
1865 establishments in Romania
Tourist attractions in Bucharest
Concert halls in Bucharest
Calea Victoriei
Dacia in art
Neoclassical architecture in Romania
19th-century architecture in Romania